John Stewart Deeble  (9 July 1931 – 5 October 2018) was an Australian academic, health economist and  the architect of Medicare in Australia.

Early life
A native of Wimmera, Deeble grew up near Donald, Victoria, and left school aged 15. 
His first job was a clerical position at the Peter McCallum Institute in Melbourne.
While working he completed a Commerce Degree at Melbourne University and a Diploma of Hospital Administration at the University of New South Wales.

Career
In 1965 he started a research position at the Institute of Applied Economic Research at the University of Melbourne. 
While working there, Deeble and Richard Scotton coauthored proposals for what became known as Medicare.
He was Special Adviser to the ministers for health in the Whitlam and Hawke governments, chairman of the planning committees for both Medibank and Medicare and a commissioner of the Health Insurance Commission for 16 years.
He was Patron of the Deeble Institute for Health Policy Research, the  research arm of the Australian Healthcare and Hospitals Association.

In 1996, in recognition of his service to community health in the fields of health economics and health insurance policy development, he was awarded the Order of Australia.

He also served as First Assistant Secretary in the Commonwealth Department of Health, Founding Director of the Australian Institute of Health and Welfare, and from 1989 to 2005, Adjunct Professor of Economics at the National Centre for Epidemiology and Population Health at the Australian National University.
He was also a World Bank consultant on healthcare financing in Hungary, Turkey and Indonesia, and from 1995 to 2005, an adviser to the government of South Africa.

He died in Canberra on 5 October 2018, aged 87. His funeral was held in Canberra on 19 October and he was buried privately in Woodend, Victoria.

References

1931 births
2018 deaths
People from Donald, Victoria
Health economists
Officers of the Order of Australia
20th-century Australian economists
21st-century Australian economists
Medicare Australia
Academic staff of the Australian National University